Samathur is a panchayat town in Coimbatore district in the Indian state of Tamil Nadu, Zamin Samathur is home to the Vanavarayar clan. Believed to have established their base here several hundred years ago, the Samathur Vanavarayars were revered initially as the polygars before taking on the role of Zamindars.   The Vanavarayar's have ruled from Samathur for generations for almost 700 years.

Demographics
 India census, Samathur had a population of 5752. Males constitute 51% of the population and females 49%. Samathur has an average literacy rate of 68%, higher than the national average of 59.5%: male literacy is 73%, and female literacy is 63%. In Samathur, 10% of the population is under 6 years of age.

Villages
Samathur includes a village named Ponnachiyur which is coming in to Samathur Town Panchayat. A Shiva temple built in Chola period Thousand years old & the name of the temple is Chozheeswarar Alayam.

India lives in its villages said Gandhiji. Every village has an eco system and something characteristic. Samathur rests in the midst of rivers, mountains and a great heritage resulting in unique characteristics. Located on the Valparai road from Pollachi, the village today is a largely populated one. It mainly thrives on agriculture as expected but also has a textile business ecosystem. There are modern textile mills and traditional hereditary hand-loom weavers. There are about nine small and ancient temples in and around the village.

References

Cities and towns in Coimbatore district